NNI-351 is an orally active inhibitor of  and neurogenesis enhancer which is under development by NeuroNascent, Inc. for the treatment of Down syndrome, depression, and post-traumatic stress disorder (PTSD). As of 2017, it is in the preclinical development stage, and has yet to progress to human clinical trials. In July of 2022, NNI-351 was granted Orphan Drug status by the FDA for the treatment of Fragile X syndrome.

See also
 List of investigational antidepressants

References

External links
 NNI-351 - NeuroNascent, Inc
 NNI-351 - AdisInsight
 Methods and pharmaceutical compositions for treating down syndrome (patent)

Diazepanes
Ethers
Experimental drugs
Fluoroarenes
Nitriles
Quinolines
Thioamides
Thioketones